Gymnopilus subtropicus is a species of agaric fungus in the family Hymenogastraceae.

Description

Habitat and distribution
Gymnopilus subtropicus grows on oak and palm logs. It has been found in Florida, Mississippi, Louisiana, and Hawaii during March and from June to August.

See also

List of Gymnopilus species

References

subtropicus
Fungi of North America
Taxa named by Lexemuel Ray Hesler
Fungi described in 1969